Like Father, Like Son is a collaborative studio album by American rappers Birdman and Lil Wayne. The album was released on October 31, 2006, through Cash Money Records and Universal Motown Records. Guest appearances include Fat Joe, T-Pain, Rick Ross, Tha Dogg Pound and All Star Cashville Prince. Producers included Swizz Beatz and Scott Storch.

The album's first single was "Stuntin' Like My Daddy". The second single released from the album was "Leather So Soft". The third single was "You Ain't Know". All of those singles have music videos. The album debuted at number three on the US Billboard 200 chart, selling 176,000 copies in its first week. The album was later certified gold by the Recording Industry Association of America (RIAA) in December 2006.

Background
In February 2006, Birdman and Lil Wayne released a mixtape, The Carter 2 Part 2: Like Father Like Son, hosted by DJ Khaled to promote the album. The mixtape had leftover tracks from Lil Wayne's album Tha Carter II and early versions of tracks that would later end up on Like Father, Like Son. According to the Cash Money's website, and an aggressive street campaign in Houston, the album was initially scheduled for release on September 26, 2006 but delays pushed the release back to October 31, 2006.  In an interview, Lil Wayne said that "Army Gunz" might be the fourth single from the album. However, the song has not been released. In January 2009, Birdman said in an interview that a movie based on the title of the album and starring him and Wayne would be released in June 2009, but it was never made.

Critical reception

Like Father, Like Son received mostly positive reviews from music critics. Allmusic gave the album three and a half stars out of five, saying, "There's probably too much get money/stack-paper for those who want Wayne to speak on the injustices New Orleans has suffered post-Katrina, or to get to work on Tha Carter III, but that's not what Like Father, Like Son is about. This is the sure sound of Cash Money steadying the ship and getting back on course".

XXL Magazine also praised the album, giving it four stars out of five (XL), saying "With solid production throughout, Wayne's ever-evolving sentence structure and Baby's uncanny swagger, Like Father, Like Son falters only in the diversity department. Over the course of the project's 20 tracks, continued references to their dope-dealing pasts ("1st Key" and "Over Here Hustlin'") begin to dilute what otherwise is a solid project that ushers in a new Cash Money dynasty."

Commercial performance
Like Father, Like Son debuted at number three on the US Billboard 200 chart, selling 176,000 copies in its first week. This became Birdman's second and Wayne's fifth US top-ten debut. In its second week, the album dropped to number seven on the chart, selling an additional 72,000 copies. On December 11, 2006, the album was certified gold by the Recording Industry Association of America (RIAA) for sales of over 500,000 copies in the United States.

Lawsuit 
In October 2009, Birdman, Lil Wayne, Cash Money Records and various music distribution outlets were sued for copyright infringement by Thomas Marasciullo, who claimed his voice was used without permission. The rappers asked him to record some "Italian-styled spoken word recordings" in 2006. The lyrics were allegedly used on "Respect" and other tracks from Like Father, Like Son and Birdman's 5 * Stunna.

Track listing

Charts

Weekly charts

Year-end charts

Certifications

External links

References

2006 albums
Birdman (rapper) albums
Lil Wayne albums
Cash Money Records albums
Albums produced by Robin Thicke
Albums produced by Scott Storch
Albums produced by Jim Jonsin
Collaborative albums